The "Land of Fires" is a monumental triptych by the Azerbaijani painter Tahir Salakhov, created in 2007. This work, one of the artists later works, crowns a cycle of paintings dedicated to the oil workers life and work in Azerbaijan.

Description 
In the central part of the triptych, called the "Caspian today", there is an image of an offshore oil platform with a burning torch of associated gas and boats sailing up to it. In the left part, called the "Temple of Fire Worshipers" - Ateshgah, with burning torches and fire worshipers, and in the right - a large group of people praying around the Maiden Tower, representing a huge burning torch.

Criticism 
As the art historian and critic Ekaterina Degot notes, this triptych interprets oil “not in an industrial, but rather a religious sense”:

See also 
 To you, humanity!

References

Paintings by Tahir Salahov